Böğürtlen is a village in the Tunceli District, Tunceli Province, Turkey. The village is populated by Kurds and had a population of 143 in 2021.

The hamlets of Dikence and Karapınar are attached to the village.

References 

Villages in Tunceli District
Kurdish settlements in Tunceli Province